Roger Eugene Olson (born 1952) is an American Baptist theologian and Professor of Christian Theology of Ethics at the Baylor University.

Biography

Personal life 
Olson was born on February 2, 1952, in Des Moines, Iowa. He is married and he and his wife have two daughters and one granddaughter. He is member of Calvary Baptist Church in Waco.

Education 
Olson studied at Open Bible College in Des Moines, North American Baptist Seminary, and Rice University, where he obtained his Ph.D. in Religious Studies in 1984, under the supervision of Nields Nielsen. He is also an ordained Baptist minister.

He was influenced by: Donald G. Bloesch, Robert Jenson, Jürgen Moltmann, Bernard Ramm, and Jack Rogers.

Career 
Since 1999, Olson has been Holder of the Foy Valentine Professor of Christian Theology of Ethics at George W. Truett Theological Seminary of Baylor University, Waco, Texas.

Theological contribution

Advocacy of Arminianism 
Olson identifies himself as a classical Arminian, and is known for his stance in favor of Arminianism. He has written several books including Arminian Theology: Myths and Realities (2006) in which he defined and defended his vision of Arminianism. Olson fundamentally defines Arminianism by God's "limited" mode of providence and by God's "predestination by foreknowledge" mode of election.

According to him, adherence to classical Arminianism is defined by being classically Protestant, affirming total depravity, conditional election, unlimited atonement, prevenient grace, and that God is in no way, and by no means the author of sin and evil but that these are only permitted by him. Olson's definition, without taking a position on the conditional preservation, is close to the view of the Remonstrants prior to 1618.

For Olson, "classical Arminianism" as defined is centered on God's Grace and sovereignty, and is intrinsically an evangelical theology. Olson also refers to "classical Arminianism" as "evangelical synergism": "Synergism" referring to cooperation between God and creature and "evangelical" to distinguish it from Catholic or Easter Orthodox synergism.

Olson says that the first principle of Arminianism is "Jesus Christ as the full and perfect revelation of the character of God". This principle has a particular significance within the Calvinism-Armininian debate, where the character of God (and especially his love) as revealed by Jesus-Christ, is for Olson, better represented by the Arminian view. Olson says that, as a consequence of this point, Arminians only believe in libertarian free will to avoid making God the author of sin and evil, and because it is an experienced reality necessary for responsibility.

Theology history and analysis 
Olson wrote a popular and widely acclaimed survey of Christian theology titled The Story of Christian Theology (1999).

He is noted for a broad view of what constitutes Protestant "orthodoxy." For example, on annihilationism he commented that some evangelical theologians have "resurrected the old polemical labels of heresy and aberrational teaching" in order to marginalize other evangelicals holding the view The mosaic of Christian belief, (2002).

Olson is one of the writers who sees two "loose coalitions" developing in evangelical theology.

Olson coined the label "Pannenberg's Principle" for Wolfhart Pannenberg's argument (1969) that God's deity is his rule - "The divinity of God and the reign of God in the world are inseparable."

He was the editor and author of the Handbook of Denominations in the United States, 14th edition (2018).

Bibliography

Books

Articles

Notes and references

Citations

Sources

External links
 Olson's faculty page 
 Olson's personal blog

1952 births
Living people
American theologians
Arminian ministers
Arminian theologians
Baptist ministers from the United States
Baylor University faculty
Writers from Des Moines, Iowa
Rice University alumni
Christian bloggers